Kivenkantaja ("Stonebearer") is the third full-length album by Finnish pagan metal band Moonsorrow. It was released on 10 March 2003 through Spinefarm Records.

Track listing

Personnel
 Mitja Harvilahti - guitars, backing vocals
 Henri Sorvali - guitars, backing and lead vocals, choir, keyboards, harmonica, accordion
 Lord Eurén - keyboards, choir, synthesizer
 Ville Seponpoika Sorvali - bass, lead and backing vocals, choir
 Marko Tarvonen - drums, backing vocals, choir, percussion, guitars

Guest musicians
 Stefan Lejon - choir
 Janne Perttilä - choir
 Hittavainen - fiddle
 Petra Lindberg - vocals

Production
 Judas - layout, photography
 Mika Jussila - mastering
 Ahti "Mein Gott" Kortelainen - recording, mixing
 Mestari Härkönen - photography

References

2003 albums
Moonsorrow albums
Spinefarm Records albums